Marie-Pierre Gatel (born 16 December 1968 in Grenoble, Isère, France) is a retired French alpine skier who competed in the 1992 Winter Olympics.

References 
 

1968 births
Living people
French female alpine skiers
Olympic alpine skiers of France
Alpine skiers at the 1992 Winter Olympics
Sportspeople from Grenoble
20th-century French women